Greg or Gregory Stewart may refer to:

 Greg Stewart (athlete) (born 1986), Canadian Paralympic athlete
 Greg Stewart (footballer) (born 1990), Scottish footballer
 Greg Stewart (ice hockey) (born 1986), professional ice hockey winger
 Greg Stewart (triathlete), Australian triathlon and duathlon athlete

See also
 W. Gregory Stewart, poet